Krynki Borowe  is a village in Gmina Grodzisk, Siemiatycze County, Podlaskie Voivodeship, Poland.

According to the 1921 census, the village was inhabited by 73 people, among whom 68 were Roman Catholic and 5 Mosaic. At the same time, 68 inhabitants declared Polish nationality, 5 Jewish. There were 14 residential buildings in the village.

The village has a population of 30.

References

Krynki Borowe